Belokrinitskaya Hierarchy is the first full and stable church hierarchy created by the Old Believers.

The Orthodox Old-Rite Church (in earlier times called the Lipovan Orthodox Old-Rite Church with jurisdiction all over the world) and Russian Orthodox Old-Rite Church constitute this hierarchy.

The First Hierarch of the Belokrinitskaja Hierarchy Orthodox Old-Rite Church nominally has the seat of his ecclesiastical see in Bila Krynytsya, a small village that lies in southwest Ukraine, just north of the border with Romania. In practice, the current incumbent, Bishop Leonty, discharges his duties from Brăila, a city on the lower Danube.

History
The hierarchy was created in 1846 by acceptance of the Greek Metropolitan Ambrose. The hierarchy is called after the name of the see of the First Hierarch Belaya Krinitsa, Bukovina, in Austria-Hungary (currently Chernivtsi Oblast, Ukraine).

Major sponsorship for organizing this hierarchy (search for a metropolitan, organizing the necessary facilities, smuggling of candidates for priesthood etc. through the Russian border in both directions) came also from the Russian Old Believers merchant families, such as Ryabushinskie and Morozovy.

Therefore, the hierarchy was immediately accepted in Moscow – especially at the Rogozhskoe cemetery. Those who could not accept the hierarchy continued to accept priests from the Russian Orthodox state church who had denounced the novelties of Patriarch Nikon. These Old Believers remained Beglopopovtsy.

See also
 Old Believers

References
 hidden europe report 8 August 2006

External links
 Official web site (Russian)
 Old Believers of Altai (official site of the Barnaul Parish Russian Orthodox Old-Rite Church) 
 Presentation (Russian)

Old Believer movement
Religious organizations established in 1846
1846 establishments in the Russian Empire